Marie Clémentine Dusabejambo (born in 1987) is a Rwandan filmmaker.

Life

Marie Clémentine Dusabejambo was born in Kigali in 1987 Rwanda.  She trained as an electrical and telecommunications engineer.

Dusabejambo's short film Lyiza won a Tanit bronze award at the Carthage Film Festival in 2012. Her short film A Place for Myself (2016) told the story of a young Rwandan girl with albinism, who struggles in the face of discrimination and stigma at primary school. Dusabejambo had become interested in the topic after hearing news reports of the 2007-2008 killings of people with albinism in Tanzania. The film premiered at the Goethe Institut in Kigali, and was shown at the 2017 Toronto Black Film Festival. It gained three awards, including the Ousmane Sembène Award, at the Zanzibar International Film Festival (ZIFF), and won a Tanit bronze award at the Carthage Film Festival in 2016. She was also nominated for Best Short Film at the 2017 Africa Movie Academy Awards, and won the Thomas Sankara Prize at the 2017 FESPACO.

Icyasha (2018) focuses on a 12-year-old boy, who wants to join the neighborhood football team but who is bullied for being effeminate. It was nominated for Best Short Film at ZIFF 2018, in the short films category at Carthage Film Festival, and for Best Short Film at the 2019 Africa Movie Academy Awards. It won the Golden Zébu for Panafrican Short Film at Rencontres du Film Court Madagascar 2019.

Films
 Lyiza, 2011
 Behind the Word, 2013
 A Place for Myself, 2016
 Icyasha / Etiquette, 2018

References

External links
 

1987 births
Living people
Rwandan film directors
Rwandan women film directors
People from Kigali